2006 UEFA U-17 Championship elite round was the second round of qualifications for the main tournament of UEFA U-17 Championship 2006. England, Spain, and France automatically qualified for this round. The winners of each group joined hosts Luxembourg at the main tournament.

Matches

Group 1

Group 2

Group 3

Group 4

Group 5

Group 6

Group 7

References

External links
rsssf
 

Elite Qualification
UEFA European Under-17 Championship qualification
2005–06 in European football